Caroline Diehl  is the founder of The Media Trust, where she was chief executive until 2017. She is also the founder and executive chairman of The Community Channel Ltd, a charitable Community Benefit Society that owns the UK broadcast television channel, Together TV.

In 2017 Diehl launched the Social Founder Network – a new global network for founders of charities and social enterprises.

Diehl is an Entrepreneur in Residence at INSEAD, an Associate of Newnham College, Cambridge, and is the founder trustee of the Small Charities Coalition. In 2004, she was awarded an MBE for services to the media industry.

Education 

Diehl has an MA Hons. Mod. & Med. Languages from Newnham College, Cambridge University, a PGCE and MA in Educational Administration at UCL's Institute of Education and a diploma in social entrepreneurship from INSEAD Business School.

Career 

Diehl began her career in 1979 as a manager at publisher and bookseller, Grant and Cutler. 

Between 1983 and 1987, she worked as a languages teacher and head of year at a London comprehensive, Queen Elizabeth’s School, before moving to the charity sector as head of European fundraising at Community Service Volunteers (CSV) in 1988, then becoming Director of CSV Media, a position she held until 1994.

Media Trust 
In 1994, Diehl founded the Media Trust, a communications charity that connects the media and communications industry with charities, communities and young people in need of vital communications training, mentoring and resources. Diehl remained chief executive until March 2017, during which time the Media Trust became the UK's leading communications charity. Under her leadership, the trust resourced over 10,000 charities and communities and 20,000 young people, supporting them to amplify their voices through high-quality, innovative media and communications initiatives and training. The Media Trust has a number of high-profile corporate members, including the BBC, ITV, C4, Sky, Discovery, Google, Facebook, AMV BBDO, dmg media, The Guardian, Trinity Mirror, Dentsu Aegis Network, Viacom, Weber Shandwick, and WPP.

Together TV 
In 2000, Diehl founded the Community Channel as a subsidiary company of The Media Trust. The Community Channel was the UK's first dedicated television channel for social action, charity and community stories, inspiring viewers to change their lives and engage with their communities. The channel became an independent charitable Community Benefit Society in 2016 after a successful crowdfunding campaign to raise funds through selling community shares. Community Channel relaunched as Together TV in 2018. A free-to-air channel, Together TV has 10 million viewers (BARB 3 minute reach), and is supported by the UK broadcasters, media, and digital sector, who provide programming, bandwidth and cross-promotion.

Social Founder Network 
Diehl established the Social Founder Network in 2017, drawing on her own experiences of founding and running organisations with a social vision. An INSEAD Entrepreneur in Residence since 2006, and founding Advisory Board member of INSEAD’s ground-breaking Social Entrepreneurship Programme (in Fontainebleau and Singapore), Diehl founded the Social Founder Network with a vision to connect founders of charities and social enterprises in person and online, and to provide support and profile to social founders in order to grow their skills and impact.

Other work 
Diehl has played a major part in ensuring that the voluntary sector's voice was heard in mainstream public discourse on media policy. She was a founder member of Public Voice, the voluntary sector consortium that campaigned for citizens' interest in communications, successfully influencing the last two UK Communications Acts and the BBC Charter Renewal.
 
Diehl published a chapter in the 2018 book, Communicating Causes (Routledge)

Awards 
 MBE: awarded for services to the media industry, 2004
 EY ‘Social Entrepreneur of the Year’; member of EY Women Entrepreneurs’ Network 
 Cannes Chimera Award (Cannes Lions & Bill and Melinda Gates Foundation), 2012
 PRCA Charity Communications Award, 2017

See also 
 Together (TV channel)

References

External links 
 Social Founder Network
 Media Trust
 Together TV

Year of birth missing (living people)
Living people
Alumni of Newnham College, Cambridge
British mass media company founders